Dai-won Moon is a South Korean-born Mexican martial artist and is known as the Father of Mexican Taekwondo. He introduced taekwondo to Mexico in 1969. Since then, with over 1.5 million taekwondo practitioners and 3,500 schools throughout the country, taekwondo has become one of the most popular sports in the nation.

Biography 
Moon was born in the small village of Duk Hap, 200 km south of Seoul. His father, Chang Wook Moon worked in the administration of President Syngman Rhee. He became a black belt at the age of 16.

Moon graduated from Texas Tech University with a degree in architecture and originally had plans to settle in the United States. He competed in various American martial arts tournaments between 1963 and 1968. He is also an alumnus of Kyung Hee University.

He first arrived in Mexico in 1968 on an invitation from a friend. According to Moon during his first visit, "I'd teach, it was very tough and [the Mexican students] endured, that I liked, a lot of spirit, courage, attitude and devotion." On May 22, 1969 he arrived with intentions to stay and has lived in the country since then. In 1975 he became a naturalized Mexican citizen and he has four Mexican-born children.

In Mexico he established Moo Duk Kwan, a school to "make Mexican taekwondo one of the strongest in the world". From 1973, when the World Taekwondo Championships began, Mexico was represented by Moon's school. Until the sixth World Championship, in Copenhagen in 1983, he personally took, trained and bankrolled the Mexican athletes. In 1975, Moon promoted the creation of the Federación Mexicana de Taekwondo.

The association of Moo Duk Kwan schools numbers around 350. Moon taught over 300,000 students and 50,000 earned black belts, earning the title of “Gran Maestro".

References 

Mexican people of Korean descent
South Korean male taekwondo practitioners
Mexican male taekwondo practitioners
Living people
South Korean emigrants to Mexico
Sportspeople from Seoul
Texas Tech University alumni
Year of birth missing (living people)
Kyung Hee University alumni
Naturalized citizens of Mexico